Jonathan Richard Turnbull (born 13 November 1962) is an English former first-class cricketer.

Turnbull was born at Northwood in November 1962. He was educated at Merchant Taylors' School, before going up to Jesus College, Oxford. While studying at Oxford, he played first-class cricket for Oxford University in 1983 and 1984, making twelve appearances against county opposition. Playing as a right-arm medium pace bowler, Turnbull took 15 wickets at an average of 51.86 in his twelve matches, with best figures of 4 for 51.

References

External links

1962 births
Living people
People from Northwood, London
People educated at Merchant Taylors' School, Northwood
Alumni of Jesus College, Oxford
English cricketers
Oxford University cricketers